Denis Richard McDonough (born December 2, 1969) is an American government official serving as the eleventh United States Secretary of Veterans Affairs under President Joe Biden since 2021.

McDonough served in the Obama administration as chief of staff at the National Security Council from 2009 to 2010 and as Deputy National Security Advisor from 2010 to 2013. He then served as White House chief of staff for the full second term of President Barack Obama from 2013 to 2017. He was the second-longest Democrat to serve as the chief of staff since John R. Steelman in 1946, and the longest since Andrew Card (5 years, 84 days) during the first and second terms of the Bush administration.

Early life and education
McDonough was born on December 2, 1969, in Stillwater, Minnesota. He was one of 11 children in a devout Irish Catholic family, his grandparents having emigrated from Connemara in the Gaeltacht.

McDonough graduated from Stillwater Area High School in 1988, then attended Saint John's University in Collegeville, Minnesota He played safety on the Johnnies football team for Hall of Fame coach John Gagliardi and was a member of teams that won two conference titles in the Minnesota Intercollegiate Athletic Conference. McDonough graduated from Saint John's University with a Bachelor of Arts, summa cum laude, in history and Spanish in 1992. After graduation, he traveled extensively throughout Latin America and taught high school in Belize.

In 1996, McDonough earned an MSFS degree at Georgetown University's Edmund A. Walsh School of Foreign Service.

Career
From 1996 to 1999, McDonough worked as an aide for the United States House Committee on Foreign Affairs, where he focused on Latin America. He then served as a senior foreign policy advisor to Senator Tom Daschle. After Daschle's reelection defeat in 2004, McDonough became legislative director for newly elected Senator Ken Salazar. McDonough was a senior fellow at the Center for American Progress in 2004.

In 2007, Senator Barack Obama's chief foreign policy advisor Mark Lippert, a Navy reservist, was called into active duty. Lippert recruited McDonough to serve as his replacement during his deployment to Iraq. McDonough continued to serve as a senior foreign policy advisor to Obama during his 2008 presidential campaign.

Obama administration

After Obama was elected president, McDonough joined the administration as the National Security Council's head of strategic communication. He also served as National Security Council chief of staff.

On October 20, 2010, Obama announced that McDonough would replace Thomas E. Donilon as Deputy National Security Advisor, who had been promoted to succeed General James L. Jones as National Security Advisor. McDonough was seen in photos of the White House Situation Room taken during the monitoring of the May 2011 SEAL operation in Pakistan that resulted in the Osama bin Laden's death.

On January 20, 2013, at the beginning of his second term in office, Obama appointed McDonough his chief of staff. In February 2013 McDonough urged lawmakers to quickly confirm Chuck Hagel and John O. Brennan to their posts in Obama's national security team, expressing "grave concern" about the delays. McDonough served as White House chief of staff through the end of Obama's second term, which ended on January 20, 2017.

Return to private life

In 2017, McDonough joined the Markle Foundation, a nonprofit that aims to "transform America's outdated labor market to reflect the needs of the digital economy," boost employment opportunities, and expand job training for Americans. As a senior principal, he worked to grow the organization nationwide and broaden its work with governments such as the state of Colorado, public institutions such as Arizona State University, and private companies such as LinkedIn.

McDonough is a professor of the practice at Notre Dame's Keough School of Global Affairs and a visiting senior fellow in Carnegie's Technology and International Affairs Program.

Secretary of Veterans Affairs (2021–present)

President Joe Biden nominated McDonough to lead the United States Department of Veterans Affairs. He appeared before the Senate Veterans Affairs Committee on January 27, 2021. On February 8, the Senate confirmed McDonough as VA Secretary by a 87–7 vote, with six senators absent. McDonough is the second non-veteran to hold this position. Vice President Kamala Harris swore him in on February 9.

Personal life 
McDonough is married to Karin Hillstrom. They have three children.

References

External links

Biography at the United States Department of Veterans Affairs

|-

|-

|-

|-

1969 births
American people of Irish descent
Articles containing video clips
Biden administration cabinet members
Catholics from Minnesota
Center for American Progress people
College of Saint Benedict and Saint John's University alumni
Georgetown University alumni
Living people
Obama administration cabinet members
People from Stillwater, Minnesota
United States Deputy National Security Advisors
United States Secretaries of Veterans Affairs
University of Notre Dame faculty
White House Chiefs of Staff
Biden administration personnel